Bob Morgan is a Democratic member of the Illinois House of Representatives for the 58th district. The district, along Chicago's North Shore suburbs, includes all or parts of the Bannockburn, Deerfield, Glencoe, Highwood, Highland Park, Lake Bluff, Lake Forest, Lincolnshire, Northbrook and North Chicago. Morgan is an attorney who has served as the state's lead healthcare attorney and its marijuana "czar". Morgan has a Bachelor of Arts from University of Illinois at Urbana–Champaign and a Juris Doctor from Northern Illinois University College of Law. He is on the boards of the Anti-Defamation League and Equip for Equality.

As of July 3, 2022, Representative Morgan is a member of the following Illinois House committees:

 Appropriations - Human Services Committee (HAPH)
 Cybersecurity, Data Analytics, and IT Committee (HCDA)
 Energy & Environment Committee (HENG)
 Health Care Licenses Committee (HHCL)
 Human Services Committee (HHSV)
 Insurance Committee (HINS)
 (Co-chairman of) Insurance Review Subcommittee (HINS-INSU)
 Medicaid Subcommittee (HHSV-MEDI)

Electoral history

References

External links
 Campaign website

Living people
21st-century American politicians
University of Illinois alumni
Northern Illinois University alumni
People from Deerfield, Illinois
Jewish American state legislators in Illinois
Democratic Party members of the Illinois House of Representatives
Year of birth missing (living people)
21st-century American Jews